is a Japanese professional footballer who plays as a goalkeeper for Major League Soccer club Vancouver Whitecaps FC.

Club statistics
Updated to 12 February 2021.

Honours

Club
Yokohama F. Marinos
 J1 League: 2022

Individual
J.League Best XI: 2022

References

External links
Profile at Yokohama F. Marinos
Profile at Yokohama FC

1993 births
Living people
Association football people from Kanagawa Prefecture
Japanese footballers
J1 League players
Major League Soccer players
Yokohama FC players
J.League U-22 Selection players
Vancouver Whitecaps FC players
Association football goalkeepers